Events from the year 1573 in France

Incumbents
 Monarch – Charles IX

Events

Births

Full date missing
Mathurin Régnier, satirist (died 1613)
Catherine of Lorraine, Abbess of Remiremont (died 1648)
François Annibal d'Estrées, diplomat and Marshal of France (died 1670)

Deaths

Full date missing
Gilles Garnier, hermit
Jacques Besson, inventor, mathematician and philosopher (born 1540?)
Michel de l'Hôpital, statesman (born 1507)
Firmin Lebel, composer and choir director
Étienne Jodelle, poet and dramatist (born 1532)

See also

References

1570s in France